Events from the year 1672 in Denmark.

Incumbents 
 Monarch - Christian V

Events 
 2 February  The Barony of Brahetrolleborg is established by  Birgitte Trolle from the manors of af Brahetrolleborg, Sølyst, Egneborg, Høbbet and Brændegård. 
 27 March  The Barony of Holckenhavn by Eiler Holck from the manors of Kogsbølle, Ellensborg and Nygård.
Holckenhavn]] is established from the manors of 
 6 April  The County of Frijsenborg is established by Mogens Friis from the manors of Frijsenborg, Jernit, Søbygård, Østergård, Favrskov, Lyngballe, Fuglsang, Frijsendal, Boller, Christiansminde, Thyrasminde and Møgelkær.
 26 May – Jørgen Iversen Dyppel is appointed to the first governor of the Danish West Indies
 20 June  The County of Langeland is established by Frederik Ahlefeldt from the manor of Tranekær as well as the farms Korsebølle, Pæregård, Blegholm, Nygård, Bjerrebygård, Nordenbrogård, Knepholm, Tryggelevgård and Søgård and the island Birkholm.
 11 November  The County of Wedellsborg is established by Wilhelm Friedrich Wedell from the manors of Wedellsborg, Tybrind, Sparretorn, Billeskov and Minendal.

Undated 
 High royal councillor Burchard Ahlefeldt received in 1672 letters patent as Danish Count Ahlefeldt.
 Jørgen Iversen Dyppel becomes the first governor of the renewed establishment of St. Thomas in the Danish West Indies.

Births 
 10 June  Christen Worm, theologian (died 1737)
 30 October – Christine Sophie Holstein, salonist (d. 1757)

References

 
Denmark
Years of the 17th century in Denmark